The Environmental Media Association (EMA) is a non-profit organization which was founded in 1989 by Cindy Horn and Lyn Lear. EMA works with the entertainment industry to encourage green production and raise the public's environmental awareness. The group provides a "Green Seal" to productions which reduce their environmental footprint. The first movie to have the EMA Green Seal in its credits was The Incredible Hulk, which made specific efforts during its 2007 filming to cut carbon emissions and waste created during production. There are also various TV episodes, such as the Futurama episode "The Problem with Popplers", and various movies have been awarded the Environmental Media Award, which is awarded to the best television show or film with an environmental message.

EMA also hosts the annual Environmental Media Awards, an awards ceremony which celebrates the entertainment industry’s environmental efforts.

References

External links
Official website

1989 establishments in the United States
Environmental organizations based in California
Sustainability organizations
Organizations established in 1989
Entertainment_rating_organizations